The Miss California World competition is a beauty pageant that selects the representative for California in the Miss World America pageant.

The current Miss California World is Melanie Wardhana of San Francisco.

Winners 
Color key

Notes to table

References

External links

California culture
Women in California